Semilaoma costata, also known as the coarse-ribbed pinhead snail, is a tiny species of land snail that is endemic to Australia's Lord Howe Island in the Tasman Sea.

Description
The subdiscoidal shell of the mature snail is 0.7–0.8 mm in height, with a diameter of 1.3–1.5 mm, and a low to flat spire. It is pale yellow to white in colour. The whorls are rounded to shouldered. The sutures are impressed, with moderately closely-spaced radial ribs. It has an ovately lunate aperture, and a moderately wide umbilicus. The animal is unknown.

Distribution and habitat
The snail is common and widespread in the North Bay and settlement areas of the island, living in plant litter.

References

 
 

 
costata
Gastropods of Lord Howe Island
Gastropods described in 2010